Toton Traction Maintenance Depot or Toton Sidings is a large traction maintenance depot located in Toton, Nottinghamshire. The TOPS depot code for the depot is TO. Before TOPS, the shed code was 16A (18A prior to 1963).

Prior to the 2021 Integrated Rail Plan for the North and Midlands, the site was the proposed location of the East Midlands Hub railway station on the Leeds Branch of HS2.

History

The history of the development of Toton is highly associated with the history, development and decline of the coal industry in England. The Midland Railway had developed the Midland Main Line from the 1860s, and had a developing revenue from coal traffic from both the Yorkshire and Nottinghamshire coalfields to the power stations of the industrialised West Midlands. This traffic was added to by the fact that most towns also had their own gasworks, with coal delivered by rail to their own private sidings, and the rapidly developing domestic use of coal for heating and cooking.

With need to marshall coal traffic, a location close to the strategically located Trent Junction became obvious, and hence the development of Toton as a railway yard from the late 19th century. The yards eventually spanned: the Old/New Banks; North Yard and Meadow; East & West Yard; Sandiacre Ballast Sidings. Coal traffic reached its peak through the yards post World War II in the 1950s, with over 1million wagons per year passing through what was then the largest marshalling yard in Europe, and the third largest in the world. Local traffic included coal and iron ore and steel from the nearby Stanton Ironworks. With the coming of the Beeching Axe, British Railways shelved all proposed development of any other marshalling yards, thereby increasing traffic through the yards further. This was the peak of Toton traffic. However, by the 1970s the yard was in decline. With the introduction of Merry-go-round trains direct from colliery to power station, and the decline in the use of domestic coal in favour of North Sea gas, rail traffic through the yards was diminishing quickly. The Down Side ceased hump shunting in 1978, followed by the Up Side in 1984. Many of the yards were lifted during the 1970s and 1980s, and in the late 1980s the yards were rationalised to the basic shape seen today. This was the era when Toton TMD was the home of Class 20, Class 56 and Class 58.

Present

Toton TMD

Since the privatisation of the UK rail network, Toton TMD has been operated by DB Cargo UK. As at 2021, it is home to the Class 60 and Class 66 diesel locomotives.

Changes in the maintenance of locomotives have also meant that Toton is now the only TMD within DB Cargo UK where heavy maintenance is carried out on locomotives. More recently a number of locos at Toton have been modified for use in France by fellow Deutsche Bahn subsidiary Euro Cargo Rail.

The traincrew depot has also declined as a result of the loss of traffic and now has a depot complement of 48 drivers (in 2010), which contrasts with the depot's complement on privatisation when around 170 drivers were based here.

Toton Marshalling Yards

The changes in traffic flows have meant changes in the way freight is handled by the yards at Toton, primarily because the great majority of the trains now originate from south of the yards and therefore have to be propelled into the North Yard. Following the remodelling of the 1970s and 1980s there is no connection directly into Toton Yards from the south.

From 2009 both the North Yard and the New Bank sidings became accessible from the south after the whole of the Toton area was re-signalled with a certain amount of remodelling also taking place. It is now also possible to depart south from the North Yard which, as its name would suggest, was designed for trains heading North.

Toton lost the last of its domestic coal traffic in the mid-2000s, when GB Railfreight took over transport originating from Daw Mill Colliery from EWS. Now the main traffic is:
Domestic coal from Scotland via Milford
Coal imports from Immingham, Avonmouth and Liverpool docks for onward transit to Ratcliffe-on-Soar Power Station
Rail infrastructure services for Network Rail, and weekend ballast and engineering trains

At 23:59 on 26 April 2009 the New Bank yard on the up side of the main lines (below the bank) was closed due to the economic situation and the associated decline in freight traffic. The mothballed yard will be used for storage of assets not currently in use, including locomotives (Class 60s) and wagons.

References

Rail Atlas Great Britain & Ireland, S.K. Baker

Further reading

External links

An overhead view of the depot.
 Toton-Rail website Images of the infrastructure and trains in the Toton area.

Railway depots in England
Rail transport in Nottinghamshire
DB Cargo UK
Midland Railway